Preda railway station is a railway station in the municipality of Bergün Filisur, in the Swiss canton of Graubünden. It is located on the  Albula line of the Rhaetian Railway. Hourly services operate on this section of the line.

Services
The following services stop at Preda:

 Regio: limited service between Chur and St. Moritz.

References

External links
 
 
 

Railway stations in Graubünden
Rhaetian Railway stations
Railway stations in Switzerland opened in 1903